Brachytrematidae is an extinct family of sea snails, marine gastropod molluscs in the clade Sorbeoconcha.

According to the taxonomy of the Gastropoda by Bouchet & Rocroi (2005) the family Brachytrematidae has no subfamilies.

References